Kings Causeway Branch is a  long 1st order tributary to the Mispillion River in Kent County, Delaware.  This is the only stream of this name in the United States.

Course
Kings Causeway Branch rises on the Brockonbridge Gut divide about 0.5 miles west of Scotts Corners, Delaware.  Kings Causeway Branch then flows south to meet the Mispillion River about 2.5 miles southeast of Herrings Corners, Delaware.

Watershed
Kings Causeway Branch drains  of area, receives about 45.3 in/year of precipitation, has a topographic wetness index of 696.03 and is about 4.8% forested.

See also
List of Delaware rivers

Maps

References

Rivers of Delaware
Rivers of Kent County, Delaware